Robert Mitchell (June 22, 1826June 21, 1899) was an American medical doctor, farmer, and Republican politician.  He served one term in the Wisconsin State Assembly, representing Marquette County, and was a Union Army surgeon throughout the American Civil War.

Background 
Mitchell was born in Moravia, New York, on June 22, 1826; he graduated from Geneva Medical College in 1845, and the University of Buffalo in 1850, and became a physician and farmer.

In Wisconsin; the war and after
Mitchell moved to Wisconsin in 1857, having spent some months in Iowa and three years in California, and went into medical practice in Portage City. During the American Civil War, Mitchell was the assistant surgeon of the 10th Wisconsin Infantry Regiment for two years, and was at the Battles of Perryville and Stone River; then became surgeon of the 27th Wisconsin Volunteers, and was at the Battle of Jenkins' Ferry, and at the siege of Mobile.

After the war, Mitchell resumed practice in Portage. He married Abby Briggs in 1867. They moved to Douglas in Marquette County in 1869, and he became a full-time farmer for some time. They returned to Portage in 1893.

Public office
Mitchell served as chairman of the town board in the Town of Douglass. In 1874, he was elected to represent Marquette County in the Assembly's 1875 session, receiving 776 votes to 654 for Democrat Neil Dimond (Democratic incumbent William Murphy was not a candidate for re-election). He was assigned to the standing committees on the militia (which he chaired) and medical societies; and to the joint committee on claims.

Mitchell was defeated when he ran for re-election to the 1876 Assembly, with 507 votes to 673 for Democrat B. Frank Goodell.

He ran once more for the Assembly, seeking election as a Democrat for the 1879 session, but lost with 718 votes to 953 for James W. Murphy (also a Democrat) and 69 votes for Greenbacker O. C. Pomeroy.
 
Mitchell spent many years on the Board of Examining Surgeons for the United States Pension Department in Portage, retaining that position through several changes of national government. He died in Portage on June 21, 1899.

References

1826 births
1899 deaths
Members of the Wisconsin State Assembly
People from Portage, Wisconsin
People from Marquette County, Wisconsin
People from Moravia, New York
People of Wisconsin in the American Civil War
Union Army surgeons
Physicians from Wisconsin
University at Buffalo alumni
Wisconsin Democrats
Wisconsin Republicans
Geneva Medical College alumni
19th-century American politicians